The 2022 Challenger Ciudad de Guayaquil was a professional tennis tournament played on clay courts. It was the 18th edition of the tournament which was part of the 2022 ATP Challenger Tour. It took place in Guayaquil, Ecuador between 31 October and 6 November 2022.

Singles main-draw entrants

Seeds

 1 Rankings are as of 24 October 2022.

Other entrants
The following players received wildcards into the singles main draw:
  Andrés Andrade
  Álvaro Guillén Meza
  Cayetano March

The following player received entry into the singles main draw using a protected ranking:
  Sumit Nagal

The following players received entry into the singles main draw as alternates:
  Nikola Milojević
  Roberto Quiroz
  Nikolás Sánchez Izquierdo

The following players received entry from the qualifying draw:
  Blaise Bicknell
  Marco Cecchinato
  Jan Choinski
  Juan Ignacio Galarza
  Eduardo Ribeiro
  Thiago Seyboth Wild

The following player received entry as a lucky loser:
  Román Andrés Burruchaga

Champions

Singles

 Daniel Altmaier def.  Federico Coria 6–2, 6–4.

Doubles

 Guido Andreozzi /  Guillermo Durán def.  Facundo Díaz Acosta /  Luis David Martínez 6–0, 6–4.

References

2022 ATP Challenger Tour
2022
2022 in Ecuadorian sport
October 2022 sports events in Ecuador
November 2022 sports events in Ecuador